The  Japanese Baseball League season

Standings

League leaders

See also
1946 All-American Girls Professional Baseball League season
1946 Major League Baseball season

References

Japanese

ja:1946年の日本プロ野球